Sırtköy, Manavgat is a village in the District of Manavgat, Antalya Province, Turkey.
Sirtkoy is in the Manavgat district of Antalya province, 104 km, from the town of Manavgat.

Most economic activity in the village is derived from the Bay, but Livestock farming are also available. The village has no primary school, health services nor sewage but does have drinking water.

The ruins of the Roman and Byzantine era city of Etenna lie scattered 400 meters from the modern village. The Altınbeşik Cave National Park lies to the east of the village.

References

Side
History of Antalya Province
Villages in Manavgat District